Below is the list of cities which were besieged by the Ottoman Empire.

Ottoman Empire military-related lists
Sieges involving the Ottoman Empire